DeviceLogics was a company in Lindon, Utah, USA, founded in November 2002. Originally doing business mostly under the DeviceLogics name, the company was incorporated as DRDOS, Inc. for legal reasons. The DeviceLogics name was later dropped.

Bryan Wayne Sparks co-founded the company, together with Bryce Burns and Troy Tribe, and acquired DR-DOS from the Canopy Group, a Utah technology venture group. Copies of DR-DOS 7.03 have been licensed and distributed by this company. The company's web site went offline in 2018.

History of DR-DOS

In 1994, Bryan W. Sparks, with help from Novell's Raymond John Noorda, founded Caldera, Inc. Caldera bought DR-DOS from Novell in 1996.

See also
 Lineo

References

External links
 Official website (archived snapshot as of 2018-07-05)
 

2002 establishments in Utah
2018 disestablishments in Utah
Software companies established in 2002
Software companies established in 2018
Defunct software companies of the United States
Companies based in Utah

de:DeviceLogics